Marco Antonio Mandruzzato (16 May 1923 – 31 October 1969) was an Italian fencer. He won a silver medal in the team épée event at the 1948 Summer Olympics.

References

1923 births
1969 deaths
Italian male fencers
Olympic fencers of Italy
Fencers at the 1948 Summer Olympics
Olympic silver medalists for Italy
Olympic medalists in fencing
Medalists at the 1948 Summer Olympics